Nyayangal Jayikkattum is a 1990 Indian Tamil-language film written and directed by Sivachandran. The film stars Sivakumar, Lakshmi and Aishwarya. It was released on 1 June 1990.

Plot 

The film revolves around the enmity between two politicians, Satyabharati and Tamilkannan.

Cast 
 Sivakumar as Sathyabharathi
 Lakshmi as Saraswati
 Aishwarya as Saraswati's daughter
 Jai Ganesh as Jagan
 Sivachandran as Victor Raj
 Kitty as Tamilkannan
 Vinod Kumar as Tamilkannan's son

Production 
Nyayangal Jayikkattum was Aishwarya's first Tamil film. It was originally titled Pethavanga Mathavanga, but later retitled.

Soundtrack 
The soundtrack was composed by Shankar–Ganesh, while the lyrics were written by Vaali.

Release and reception 
Nyayangal Jayikkattum was released on 1 June 1990. N. Krishnaswamy of The Indian Express wrote, "Sivachandran's script does get you involved in the film and concerned about its characters." C. R. K. of Kalki praised the performances of lead artistes but was critical of certain scenes and logical mistakes.

References

External links 
 

1990s political drama films
1990s Tamil-language films
Films directed by Sivachandran
Films scored by Shankar–Ganesh
Indian political drama films